Global Underground 038: Black Rock Desert is a DJ mix album in the Global Underground series, compiled and mixed by Carl Cox. The album replicates Cox's mix at The Opulent Temple, a dance event staged as part of the Burning Man festival in Nevada's Black Rock Desert in 2009. This is Cox's first appearance in the Global Underground series.

Track listing

References

External links

Global Underground
2010 compilation albums